Dr. Khalid Al-Dakhil is a Saudi-Arabian assistant professor of political sociology at King Saud University in Saudi Arabia. He has been a columnist for London's Al-Hayat newspaper and is now a columnist for the Al-Ittihad newspaper. He is widely published in Arabic journals. He received his Ph.D. and M.A. from the University of California, Los Angeles.

During his four-month tenure at the Carnegie Endowment, his research and outreach focused on Saudi politics, history, and reform as well as the country's relations with the United States. His contribution augmented the Middle East Political Reform Initiative of Carnegie's Democracy and Rule of Law Project.

References

External links
"Saudi Writer Recasts Kingdom's History", The Washington Post, 4 February 2007.
"The Rise of the Wahhabi Movement and the Saudi State", The Washington Post, 5 February 2007 - Interview
Articles by Khalid Al-Dakhil at "Saudi Debate"
Many articles are in the website of al-Ittihad newspaper. See (http://www.wajhat.com)
Also see "Forbes Arabia", a monthly magazine, for the last two years.
A reader's book entitled "Religion and Politics in Saudi Arabia: Wahhabism and the State".

Living people
Academic staff of King Saud University
University of California, Los Angeles alumni
Year of birth missing (living people)